The 1918 United States House of Representatives elections were elections for the United States House of Representatives to elect members to serve in the 66th United States Congress. They were held for the most part on November 5, 1918, while Maine held theirs on September 9. They occurred in the middle of President Woodrow Wilson's second term.

With the country in World War I (contrary to previous promises by Wilson), and Wilson's personal popularity ebbing, the Republicans gained 25 seats and took over control of the House from Wilson's Democrats. Internal divide among Democratic leadership over aspects related to payment of the war also decreased the unity of the party, which had been the organization's strength during the decade. The Progressive Party also disappeared, with its former members generally becoming Democrats. Minnesota's Farmer–Labor Party, a descendant of populism, also gained its very first seat.

Frederick H. Gillett (R-Massachusetts) became Speaker, and previous speaker Champ Clark (D-Missouri) became Minority Leader.

Background

Woodrow Wilson was elected to the presidency in the 1912 presidential election and his victory in the 1916 election made him the first Democratic president to win reelection since Andrew Jackson had in the 1832 election.

Wilson's wheat policies aided in the Democratic defeat. The Food and Fuel Control Act allowed for the cost of wheat to be set at a price control limit of $2.20 per bushel while other products like cotton were not. Wilson later vetoed an attempt by the Republicans to increase the limit to $2.40 per bushel. Republicans were more likely to gain seats in areas with higher amounts of wheat acreage with the Republicans gaining twenty-two seats in the ten highest wheat producing states while the Democrats only gained two seats.

Wilson was also unable to aid the Democratic candidates before the election due to his preparations for involvement in the Paris Peace Conference.

Overall results

1 One vacancy, Victor L. Berger, a member of the Socialist Party of America, whom the House refused to seat.

Election summaries

Special elections 

Sorted by election date, then by state/district.

Alabama

Arizona

Arkansas

California

Colorado

Connecticut

Delaware

Florida

Georgia

Idaho 

This was the first election in which Idaho was divided into districts, formerly it had had a single at-large district with two seats.

Illinois

Indiana

Iowa

Kansas

Kentucky

Louisiana

Maine

Maryland

Massachusetts

Michigan

Minnesota

Mississippi

Missouri

Montana

Nebraska

Nevada

New Hampshire

New Jersey

New Mexico

New York

North Carolina

North Dakota

Ohio

Oklahoma

Oregon

Pennsylvania

Rhode Island

South Carolina

South Dakota

Tennessee

Texas

Utah

Vermont

Virginia

Washington

West Virginia

Wisconsin

Wyoming

Non-voting delegates

Alaska Territory 

As he had successfully done the previous time, Wickersham again contested the election. During the contest, Sulzer died April 28, 1919, and Democrat George Barnes Grigsby won the June 5 special election to finish the term. Wickersham then won the election contest and was seated March 1, 1921.

See also 
 1918 United States elections
 1918 United States Senate elections
 65th United States Congress
 66th United States Congress

Notes

References

Bibliography

External links 
 

 
United States home front during World War I